Spoleto (also , ,) is an ancient city in the Italian province of Perugia in east-central Umbria on a foothill of the Apennines. It is  S. of Trevi,  N. of Terni,  SE of Perugia;  SE of Florence; and  N of Rome.

History

Spoleto was situated on the eastern branch of the Via Flaminia, which forked into two roads at Narni and rejoined at Forum Flaminii, near Foligno. An ancient road also ran hence to Nursia. The Ponte Sanguinario of the 1st century BC still exists. The Forum lies under today's marketplace.

Located at the head of a large, broad valley, surrounded by mountains, Spoleto has long occupied a strategic geographical position.  It appears to have been an important town to the original Umbri tribes, who built walls around their settlement in the 5th century BC, some of which are visible today.

The first historical mention of Spoletium is the notice of the foundation of a colony there in 241 BC; and it was still, according to Cicero colonia latina in primis firma et illustris: a Latin colony in 95 BC. After the Battle of Lake Trasimene (217 BC)  Spoletium was attacked by Hannibal, who was repulsed by the inhabitants. During the Second Punic War the city was a useful ally to Rome. It suffered greatly during the civil wars of Gaius Marius and Sulla. The latter, after his victory over Marius, confiscated the territory of Spoletium (82 BC). From this time forth it was a municipium.

Under the empire it seems to have flourished once again, but is not often mentioned in history.  Martial speaks of its wine. Aemilianus, who had been proclaimed emperor by his soldiers in Moesia, was slain by them here on his way from Rome (AD 253), after a reign of three or four months. Rescripts of Constantine (326) and Julian (362) are dated from Spoleto. The foundation of the episcopal see dates from the 4th century: early martyrs of Spoleto are legends, but a letter to the bishop Caecilianus, from Pope Liberius in 354 constitutes its first historical mention. Owing to its elevated position Spoleto was an important stronghold during the Vandal and Gothic wars; its walls were dismantled by Totila.

Under the Lombards, Spoleto became the capital of an independent duchy, the Duchy of Spoleto (from 570), and its dukes ruled a considerable part of central Italy. In 774 it became part of Holy Roman Empire. Several of its dukes, mainly during the late 9th Century, rose to wear the crown of that Empire. Together with other fiefs, it was bequeathed to Pope Gregory VII by the powerful countess Matilda of Tuscany, but for some time struggled to maintain its independence. In 1155 it was destroyed by Frederick Barbarossa. In 1213 it was definitively occupied by Pope Gregory IX. During the absence of the papal court in Avignon, it was prey to the struggles between Guelphs and Ghibellines, until in 1354 Cardinal Albornoz brought it once more under the authority of the Papal States. 

After Napoleon's conquest of Italy, in 1809 Spoleto became capital of the short-lived French department of Trasimène, returning to the Papal States after Napoleon's defeat, within five years. In 1860, after a gallant defence, Spoleto was taken by the troops fighting for the unification of Italy. Giovanni Pontano, founder of the Accademia Pontaniana of Naples, was born here. Another child of Spoleto was Francis Possenti who was educated in the Jesuit school and whose father was the Papal assessor, Francis later entered the Passionists and became Saint Gabriel of Our Lady of Sorrows.

Main sights

Ancient and lay buildings
The Roman theater, largely rebuilt. The stage is occupied by the former church of St. Agatha, currently housing the National Archaeological Museum.
Ponte Sanguinario ("bloody bridge"), a Roman bridge 1st century BC. The name is traditionally attributed to the persecutions of Christians in the nearby amphitheatre.
A restored Roman house with mosaic floors, indicating it was built in the 1st century, and overlooked the Forum Square. An inscription by Polla to Emperor Caligula suggests the house was that of Vespasia Polla, the mother of Emperor Vespasian.
Roman Amphitheater: Ancient Roman amphitheater from the 2nd century AD. It was turned into a fortress by Totila in 545 and in Middle Ages times was used for stores and shops, while the cavea the church of San Gregorio Minore was built. The stones were later used to build the Rocca Albornoziana.
Palazzo Comunale (13th century).
Ponte delle Torri( )(in Italian), a striking 13th-century aqueduct, possibly on Roman foundations: whether it was first built by the Romans is a point on which scholarly opinion is divided.
Rocca Albornoziana: majestic fortress built in 1359–1370 by the architect Matteo Gattapone of Gubbio for Cardinal Albornoz. It has six sturdy towers which formed two distinct inner spaces: the Cortile delle Armi, for the troops, and the Cortile d'onore for the use of the city's governor. The latter courtyard is surrounded by a two-floor porch. The rooms include the Camera Pinta ("Painted Room") with noteworthy 15th‑century frescoes. After having resisted many sieges, the Rocca was turned into a jail in 1800 and used as such until the late 20th century. After extensive renovation it was reopened as a museum in 2007.
Palazzo Racani-Arroni (16th century) has a worn graffito decoration attributed to Giulio Romano. The inner courtyard has a notable fountain.
Palazzo della Signoria (14th century), housing the city's museum.
Palazzo Vigili (15th-16th centuries) palace includes the Torre dell'Olio (13th century), the sole remaining medieval city tower in Spoleto.
Temple of Clitumnus lies between Spoleto and Trevi

Churches
Duomo (Cathedral) of S. Maria Assunta: Construction of the Duomo begun around 1175 and completed in 1227. The Romanesque edifice contains the tomb of Filippo Lippi, who died in Spoleto in 1469, designed by his son Filippino Lippi. The church also houses a manuscript letter by Saint Francis of Assisi.
San Pietro extra Moenia: church founded in 419 to house the supposed chains that once bound St Peter. It was built over an ancient necropolis. Reconstructed from 12th to 15th century, when a Romanesque façade added with three doors with rose-windows, with a splendid relief decoration by local artists, portraying stories of the life of St. Peter. Along with San Rufino, Assisi, the finest extant specimens of Umbrian Romanesque. The church is preceded by a large staircase. In the 17th century the interior was refurbished in Baroque style, with basilica plan with a nave, two aisles, and an elliptical dome. 
Basilica of San Salvatore: 4th-5th century church incorporates the cella of a Roman temple and is one of the most important examples of Early Christian architecture. It was remade by the Lombards in the 8th century. In 2011, it became a UNESCO World Heritage Site as part of a group of seven inscribed as Longobards in Italy, Places of Power (568–774 A.D.).
San Ponziano:  monastery and 12th-century Romanesque church standing outside the city's walls, dedicated to the patron saint of Spoleto. The church was modified in later centuries by Giuseppe Valadier. The crypt, however, has remained untouched, with its five small naves and small apses with cross-vault, ancient Roman spolia columns and frescoes of the 14th-15th centuries.
Santa Maria della Manna d'Oro: former sanctuary built in octagonal plan facing the piazza del Duomo. Putatively erected by town's merchants to thank the Madonna for sparing the city from plundering by the Imperial army in 1527. Presently exhibition hall.
San Domenico (13th century) is a Gothic construction in white and pink stone. The interior has notable paintings by Giovanni Lanfranco. The crypt is a former church dedicated to St Peter, with frescoed walls.
San Gregorio Maggiore: 11th-12th century church recently restored to original Romanesque elements. The façade has a 16th-century portico that includes the Chapel of the Innocents (14th century) with a noteworthy font. The main external feature is the high belfry, finished in the 15th century. The interior has three naves with spolia columns and pillars.
Santi Giovanni e Paolo: deconsecrated Romanesque church featuring, on the exterior, a 13th-century fresco portraying Madonna with Saints. The interior frescoes, from the 13th-15th centuries, include some of the most ancient representations of the martyrdom of St. Thomas Becket, by Alberto Sotio, and of St. Francis.
Basilica of Sant'Eufemia: example of 12th century Romanesque architecture influenced by Lombardy and Veneto. The interior has three naves with spolia columns. 
San Paolo inter vineas (10th century) Romanesque church with rose-window of the façade.
Former church and Augustinian convent of San Nicolò (1304) is a rare example of Gothic style in Spoleto. The small church has a single nave with a splendid polygonal apse with mullioned windows. Under the apse is the church of Santa Maria della Misericordia. There are two cloisters, the more recent one pertaining to the 15th century.
San Filippo Neri: Baroque construction of mid-17th century, designed by the Loreto Scelli.
Sant'Ansano: 18th-century church built atop more ancient buildings including a 1st-century Roman temple and the mediaeval Crypt of St Isaac. It has a cloister from the 16th century.
Santi Simone e Giuda: 13th-century church completed in 1280, that has undergone many restorations and losses.

Culture
The Festival dei Due Mondi (Festival of the Two Worlds) was founded in 1958. Because Spoleto was a small town, where real estate and other goods and services were at the time relatively inexpensive, and also because there are two indoor theatres, a Roman theatre and many other spaces, it was chosen by Gian Carlo Menotti as the venue for an arts festival. It is also fairly close to Rome, with good rail connections. It is an important cultural event, held annually in late June-early July.

The festival has developed into one of the most important cultural manifestations in Italy, with a three-week schedule of music, theater and dance performances. For some time it became a reference point for modern sculpture exhibits, and works of art left to the city by Alexander Calder and others are a testimony to this.

In the United States, a parallel festival — Spoleto Festival USA — held in Charleston, South Carolina was founded in 1977 with Menotti's involvement. The twinning only lasted some 15 years and, after growing disputes between the Menotti family and the Spoleto Festival USA board, in the early 1990s a separation was consummated. However, following Menotti's death in February 2007, the city administrations of Spoleto and Charleston started talks to re-unite the two festivals which would climax in Spoleto mayor Massimo Brunini's attending the opening ceremony of Spoleto Festival USA in May 2008.  For a short period of time, a third parallel festival was also held in Melbourne, Australia. 
 
In 1992, the Spoleto Arts Symposium was initiated with the purpose of bringing talented people from all around the world to study in Spoleto. The program apparently ceased in 2009, to be replaced by a similar program, started by the College-Conservatory of Music (CCM) of the University of Cincinnati in 2010.

Sport
Spoleto gained its main results in sport with the local Volleyball team, Olio Venturi Spoleto, who classified in the quarter-finals of the Italian championship in sport.

The town's football team, A.D. Voluntas Calcio Spoleto, play in Serie D.

ASD Spoleto Rugby, is the Rugby Union club of the town. They affiliated with FIR in 2014 and they play at Serie C2.

The "Stadio Communale" hosted an international Rugby League match, in 2018. The Italian National team (of the Lega Italiana Rugby Football League) played vs the British - Asian Rugby League Association (BARA). BARA won the match.

Twin towns – sister cities
 Charleston, USA
 Schwetzingen, Germany
 Cajamarca, Peru
 Orange, France
 Cetinje, Montenegro

Frazioni
Various suburbs and small villages surrounding the city of Spoleto (collectively referred to as "Frazioni") include: Acquaiola, Acquacastagna, Ancaiano, Azzano, Baiano, Bazzano Inferiore, Bazzano Superiore, Beroide, Camporoppolo, Campo Salese, Cerqueto, Cese, Collerisana, Collicelli, Cortaccione, Crocemaroggia, Eggi, Fogliano, Forca di Cerro, Madonna di Baiano, Maiano, Messenano, Milano, Montebiblico, Monteluco, Monte Martano, Morgnano, Morro, Ocenelli, Palazzaccio, Perchia, Petrognano, Pompagnano, Pontebari, Poreta, Protte, Rubbiano, San Brizio, San Giacomo, San Giovanni di Baiano, San Martino in Trignano, San Nicolò, San Silvestro, Santa Croce, Sant'Anastasio, Sant'Angelo in Mercole, San Venanzo, Silvignano, Somma, Strettura, Terraia, Terzo la Pieve, Terzo San Severo, Testaccio, Uncinano, Valdarena, Valle San Martino, Vallocchia, Aloha.

See also
Roman Catholic Archdiocese of Spoleto-Norcia
Villa Pianciani

References

External links

Official website
Charleston & Spoleto's Sister City Web Site
Official web site of the public and private turistic operators of Spoleto
Pro Loco Spoleto
Spoleto OnLine
Spoleto Festival
Spoleto Storia
Festival of the Two Worlds
UmbriaOnline: Spoleto
ITALYscapes - Spoleto

 
Hilltowns in Umbria
Roman sites of Umbria